Pentila petreoides, the western red pentila, is a butterfly in the family Lycaenidae. It is found in Guinea, Sierra Leone, Liberia, Ivory Coast and Ghana. The habitat consists of forests.

References

Butterflies described in 1915
Poritiinae